Hicksford–Emporia Historic District, also known as Emporia, is a national historic district located at Emporia, Virginia. The district includes 36 contributing buildings and 2 contributing objects in the Hicksford section of Emporia. In 1848, Hicksford was a stop on the Petersburg Railroad. In 1887, the
neighboring towns of Hicksford and Belfield merged to form the town of Emporia.  The district generally consists of late 19th century or early 20th
century, when Hicksford–Emporia began to evolve from a small agricultural outpost to a large commercial and governmental center. Located at the heart of the district is the separately listed Greensville County Courthouse Complex.  Other notable buildings include the Citizen's National Bank (c. 1910), the Widow's Son's Masonic Lodge (1905), First Presbyterian Church (1907-1908), Emporia Elementary School (1907, 1925), Emporia Armory (mid-1930s), Greensville County Auditorium (1934), and Emporia Post Office (1938). The Old Merchants and Farmers Bank Building is also separately listed.

It was listed on the National Register of Historic Places in 2007.

Gallery

References

National Register of Historic Places in Emporia, Virginia
Neoclassical architecture in Virginia
Historic districts on the National Register of Historic Places in Virginia
Buildings and structures in Emporia, Virginia